Eric van der Linden (born 17 April 1974 in Schagen, North Holland) is an athlete from the Netherlands.  He competes in triathlon.

Van der Linden competed at the first Olympic triathlon at the 2000 Summer Olympics.  He took forty-second place with a total time of 1:54:32.04.

References

1974 births
Living people
People from Schagen
Dutch male triathletes
Triathletes at the 2000 Summer Olympics
Olympic triathletes of the Netherlands
Sportspeople from North Holland